Maternal death or maternal mortality is defined in slightly different ways by several different health organizations. The World Health Organization (WHO) defines maternal death as the death of a pregnant mother due to complications related to pregnancy, underlying conditions worsened by the pregnancy or management of these conditions. This can occur either while they are pregnant or within six weeks of resolution of the pregnancy. The CDC definition of pregnancy-related deaths extends the period of consideration to include one year from the resolution of the pregnancy. Pregnancy associated death, as defined by the American College of Obstetricians and Gynecologists (ACOG), are all deaths occurring within one year of a pregnancy resolution. Identification of pregnancy associated deaths is important for deciding whether or not the pregnancy was a direct or indirect contributing cause of the death.

There are two main measures used when talking about the rates of maternal mortality in a community or country. These are the maternal mortality ratio and maternal mortality rate, both abbreviated as "MMR". By 2017, the world maternal mortality rate had declined 44% since 1990; however, every day 808 women die from pregnancy or childbirth related causes. According to the United Nations Population Fund (UNFPA) 2017 report, about every 2 minutes a woman dies because of complications due to child birth or pregnancy. For every woman who dies, there are about 20 to 30 women who experience injury, infection, or other birth or pregnancy related complication.

UNFPA estimated that 303,000 women died of pregnancy or childbirth related causes in 2015. The WHO divides causes of maternal deaths into two categories: direct obstetric deaths and indirect obstetric deaths. Direct obstetric deaths are causes of death due to complications of pregnancy, birth or termination. For example, these could range from severe bleeding to obstructed labor, for which there are highly effective interventions. Indirect obstetric deaths are caused by pregnancy interfering or worsening an existing condition, like a heart problem.

As women have gained access to family planning and skilled birth attendant with backup emergency obstetric care, the global maternal mortality ratio has fallen from 385 maternal deaths per 100,000 live births in 1990 to 216 deaths per 100,000 live births in 2015. Many countries halved their maternal death rates in the last 10 years. Although attempts have been made to reduce maternal mortality, there is much room for improvement, particularly in low-resource regions. Over 85% of maternal deaths are in low-resource communities in Africa and Asia.  In higher resource regions, there are still significant areas with room for growth, particularly as they relate to racial and ethnic disparities and inequities in maternal mortality and morbidity rates.

Overall, maternal mortality is an important marker of the health of the country and reflects on its health infrastructure. Lowering the amount of maternal death is an important goal of many health organizations world-wide.

Causes

Direct obstetric deaths

Overview 
Direct obstetric deaths are due to complications of pregnancy, birth, termination or complications arising from their management.

The causes of maternal death vary by region and level of access. According to a study published in the Lancet which covered the period from 1990 to 2013, the most common causes of maternal death world-wide are postpartum bleeding (15%), complications from unsafe abortion (15%), hypertensive disorders of pregnancy (10%), postpartum infections (8%), and obstructed labor (6%). Other causes include blood clots (3%) and pre-existing conditions (28%).

Descriptions by condition 
Postpartum bleeding happens when there is uncontrollable bleeding from the uterus, cervix or vaginal wall after birth. This can happen when the uterus does not contract correctly after birth, there is left over placenta in the uterus, or there are cuts in the cervix or vagina from birth.

Hypertensive disorders of pregnancy happen when the body does not regulate blood pressure correctly. In pregnancy, this is due to changes at the level of the blood vessels, likely because of the placenta. This includes medical conditions like gestational hypertension and pre-eclampsia.

Postpartum infections are infections of the uterus or other parts of the reproductive tract after the resolution of a pregnancy. They are usually bacterial and cause fever, increased pain, and foul-smelling discharge.

Obstructed labor happens when the baby does not properly move into the pelvis and out of the body during labor. The most common cause of obstructed labor is when the baby's head is too big or angled at a way that does not allow it to pass through the pelvis and birth canal.

Blood clots can occur in different vessels in the body, including vessels in the arms, legs, and lungs. They can cause problems in the lung, as well as travel to the heart or brain, leading to complications.

Unsafe abortion 

When abortion is legal and accessible, it is widely regarded as safer than carrying a pregnancy to term and delivery. In fact, a study published in the journal Obstetrics & Gynecology reported that in the United States, carrying a pregnancy to term and delivering a baby comes with 14 times increased risk of death as compared to a legal abortion. However, in many regions of the world, abortion is not legal and can be unsafe. Maternal deaths caused by improperly performed procedures are preventable and contribute 13% to the maternal mortality rate worldwide. This number is increased to 25% in countries where other causes of maternal mortality are low, such as in Eastern European and South American countries. This makes unsafe abortion practices the leading cause of maternal death worldwide.

Unsafe abortion is another major cause of maternal death worldwide. In regions where abortion is legal and accessible, abortion is safe and does not contribute greatly to overall rates of maternal death. However, in regions where abortions are not legal, available, or regulated, unsafe abortion practices can cause significant rates of maternal death.  According to the World Health Organization in 2009, every eight minutes a woman died from complications arising from unsafe abortions.

Unsafe abortion practices are defined by the WHO as procedures that are performed by someone without the appropriate training and/or ones that are performed in an environment that is not considered safe or clean. Using this definition, the WHO estimates that out of the 45 million abortions that are performed each year globally, 19 million of these are considered unsafe, and 97% of these unsafe abortions occur in developing countries.  Complications include hemorrhage, infection, sepsis and genital trauma.

Rates 

There are four primary types of data sources that are used to collect abortion-related maternal mortality rates: confidential enquiries, registration data, verbal autopsy, and facility-based data sources. A verbal autopsy is a systematic tool that is used to collect information on the cause of death from laypeople and not medical professionals.

Confidential enquires for maternal deaths do not occur very often on a national level in most countries. Registration systems are usually considered the "gold-standard" method for mortality measurements. However, they have been shown to miss anywhere between 30 and 50% of all maternal deaths. Another concern for registration systems is that 75% of all global births occur in countries where vital registration systems do not exist, meaning that many maternal deaths occurring during these pregnancies and deliveries may not be properly record through these methods. There are also issues with using verbal autopsies and other forms of survey in recording maternal death rates. For example, the family's willingness to participate after the loss of a loved one, misclassification of the cause of death, and under-reporting all present obstacles to the proper reporting of maternal mortality causes. Finally, an potential issue with facility-based data collection on maternal mortality is the likelihood that women who experience abortion-related complications to seek care in medical facilities. This is due to fear of social repercussions or legal activity in countries where unsafe abortion is common since it is more likely to be legally restrictive and/or more highly stigmatizing. Another concern for issues related to errors in proper reporting for accurate understanding of maternal mortality is the fact that global estimates of maternal deaths related to a specific cause present those related to abortion as a proportion of the total mortality rate. Therefore, any change, whether positive or negative, in the abortion-related mortality rate is only compared relative to other causes, and this does not allow for proper implications of whether abortions are becoming more safe or less safe with respect to the overall mortality of women.

Prevention 

The prevention and reduction of maternity death is one of the United Nations' Sustainable Development Goals, specifically Goal 3, "Good health and well being".  Promoting effective contraceptive use and information distributed to a wider population, with access to high-quality care, can make steps towards reducing the number of unsafe abortions. For nations that allow contraceptives, programs should be instituted to allow the easier accessibility of these medications. However, this alone will not eliminate the demand for safe services, awareness on safe abortion services, health education on prenatal check ups and proper implementation of diets during pregnancy and lactation also contributes to its prevention.

Indirect obstetric deaths 
Indirect obstetric deaths are caused by preexisting health problem worsened by pregnancy or newly developed health problem unrelated to pregnancy . Fatalities during but unrelated to a pregnancy are termed accidental, incidental, or non-obstetrical maternal deaths.

Indirect causes include malaria, anemia, HIV/AIDS, and cardiovascular disease, all of which may complicate pregnancy or be aggravated by it. Risk factors associated with increased maternal death include the age of the mother, obesity before becoming pregnant, other pre-existing chronic medical conditions, and cesarean delivery.

Risk factors 
According to a 2004 WHO publication, sociodemographic factors such as age, access to resources and income level are significant indicators of maternal outcomes. Young mothers face higher risks of complications and death during pregnancy than older mothers, especially adolescents aged 15 years or younger. Adolescents have higher risks for postpartum hemorrhage, endometritis, operative vaginal delivery, episiotomy, low birth weight, preterm delivery, and small-for-gestational-age infants, all of which can lead to maternal death. The leading cause of death for girls at the age of 15 in developing countries is complication through pregnancy and childbirth. They have more pregnancies, on average, than women in developed countries, and it has been shown that 1 in 180 15-year-old girls in developing countries who become pregnant will die due to complications during pregnancy or childbirth. This is compared to women in developed countries, where the likelihood is 1 in 4900 live births. However, in the United States, as many women of older age continue to have children, the maternal mortality rate has risen in some states, especially among women over 40 years old.

Structural support and family support influences maternal outcomes. Furthermore, social disadvantage and social isolation adversely affects maternal health which can lead to increases in maternal death. Additionally, lack of access to skilled medical care during childbirth, the travel distance to the nearest clinic to receive proper care,  number of prior births, barriers to accessing prenatal medical care and poor infrastructure all increase maternal deaths.

Causes of maternal death in the US 
Pregnancy-related deaths between 2011 and 2014 in the United States have been shown to have major contributions from non-communicable diseases and conditions, and the following are some of the more common causes related to maternal death: cardiovascular diseases (15.2%.), non-cardiovascular diseases (14.7%), infection or sepsis (12.8%), hemorrhage (11.5%), cardiomyopathy (10.3%), pulmonary embolism (9.1%), cerebrovascular accidents (7.4%), hypertensive disorders of pregnancy (6.8%), amniotic fluid embolism (5.5%), and anesthesia complications (0.3%).

Three delays model
The three delays model addresses three critical factors that inhibit women from receiving appropriate maternal health care. These factors include:

 Delay in seeking care
 Delay in reaching care
 Delay in receiving adequate and appropriate care

Delays in seeking care are due to the decisions made by the women who are pregnant and/or other decision-making individuals. Decision-making individuals can include a spouse and family members. Examples of reasons for delays in seeking care include lack of knowledge about when to seek care, inability to afford health care, and women needing permission from family members.

Delays in reaching care include factors such as limitations in transportation to a medical facility, lack of adequate medical facilities in the area, and lack in confidence in medicine.

Delays in receiving adequate and appropriate care may result from an inadequate number of trained providers, lack of appropriate supplies, and the lack of urgency or understanding of an emergency.

The three delays model illustrates that there are a multitude of complex factors, both socioeconomic and cultural, that can result in maternal death.

Measurement

The four measures of maternal death are the maternal mortality ratio (MMR), maternal mortality rate, lifetime risk of maternal death and proportion of maternal deaths among deaths of women of reproductive years (PM).

Maternal mortality ratio (MMR) is the ratio of the number of maternal deaths during a given time period per 100,000 live births during the same time-period. The MMR is used as a measure of the quality of a health care system.

Maternal mortality rate (MMRate) is the number of maternal deaths in a population divided by the number of women of reproductive age, usually expressed per 1,000 women.

Lifetime risk of maternal death is a calculated prediction of a woman's risk of death after each consecutive pregnancy. The calculation pertains to women during their reproductive years. The adult lifetime risk of maternal mortality can be derived using either the maternal mortality ratio (MMR), or the maternal mortality rate (MMRate).

Proportion of maternal deaths among deaths of women of reproductive age (PM) is
the number of maternal deaths in a given time period divided by the total deaths among women aged 15–49 years.

Approaches to measuring maternal mortality include civil registration system, household surveys, census, reproductive age mortality studies (RAMOS) and verbal autopsies. The most common household survey method, recommended by the WHO as time- and cost-effective, is the sisterhood method.

Trends
The United Nations Population Fund (UNFPA; formerly known as the United Nations Fund for Population Activities) have established programs that support efforts in reducing maternal death. These efforts include education and training for midwives, supporting access to emergency services in obstetric and newborn care networks, and providing essential drugs and family planning services to pregnant women or those planning to become pregnant. They also support efforts for review and response systems regarding maternal deaths.

According to the 2010 United Nations Population Fund report, low-resource nations account for ninety-nine percent of maternal deaths with the majority of those deaths occurring in Sub-Saharan Africa and Southern Asia. Globally, high and middle income countries experience lower maternal deaths than low income countries. The Human Development Index (HDI) accounts for between 82 and 85 percent of the maternal mortality rates among countries. In most cases, high rates of maternal deaths occur in the same countries that have high rates of infant mortality. These trends are a reflection that higher income countries have stronger healthcare infrastructure, more doctors, use more advanced medical technologies and have fewer barriers to accessing care than low income countries. In low income countries, the most common cause of maternal death is obstetrical hemorrhage, followed by hypertensive disorders of pregnancy. This is contrast to high income countries, for which the most common cause is thromboembolism.

Between 1990 and 2015, the maternal mortality ratio has decreased from 385 deaths per 100,000 live births to 216 maternal deaths per 100,000 live births. Some factors that have been attributed to the decreased maternal deaths seen between this period are in part to the access that women have gained to family planning services and skilled birth attendance, meaning a midwife, doctor, or trained nurse), with back-up obstetric care for emergency situations that may occur during the process of labor. This can be examined further by looking at statistics in some areas of the world where inequities in access to health care services reflect an increased number of maternal deaths. The high maternal death rates also reflect disparate access to health services between resource communities and those that are high-resource or affluent.

The disparities in maternal health outcomes are also present among racial groups.  In the United States, black women are 3-4 times more likely to die from maternal mortality than white women. Unequal access to quality medical care, socioeconomic disparities, and systemic racism by health care providers are factors that have contributed to the high maternal mortality rates among black women.

Prevention
According to UNFPA, there are four essential elements for prevention of maternal death. These include, prenatal care, assistance with birth, access to emergency obstetric care and adequate postnatal care. It is recommended that expectant mothers receive at least four antenatal visits to check and monitor the health of mother and fetus. Second, skilled birth attendance with emergency backup such as doctors, nurses and midwives who have the skills to manage normal deliveries and recognize the onset of complications. Third, emergency obstetric care to address the major causes of maternal death which are hemorrhage, sepsis, unsafe abortion, hypertensive disorders and obstructed labor. Lastly, postnatal care which is the six weeks following delivery. During this time, bleeding, sepsis and hypertensive disorders can occur, and newborns are extremely vulnerable in the immediate aftermath of birth. Therefore, follow-up visits by a health worker to assess the health of both mother and child in the postnatal period is strongly recommended.

Additionally, reliable access to information, compassionate counseling and quality services for the management of any issues that arise from abortions (whether safe or unsafe) can be beneficial in reducing the number of maternal deaths. In regions where abortion is legal,  abortion practices need to be safe in order to effectively reduce the number of maternal deaths related to abortion.

Maternal Death Surveillance and Response is another strategy that has been used to prevent maternal death. This is one of the interventions proposed to reduce maternal mortality where maternal deaths are continuously reviewed to learn the causes and factors that led to the death. The information from the reviews is used to make recommendations for action to prevent future similar deaths. Maternal and perinatal death reviews have been in practice for a long time worldwide, and the World Health Organization (WHO) introduced the Maternal and Perinatal Death Surveillance and Response (MPDSR) with a guideline in 2013. Studies have shown that acting on recommendations from MPDSR can reduce maternal and perinatal mortality by improving quality of care in the community and health facilities.

Prenatal care 
It was estimated that in 2015, a total of 303,000 women died due to causes related to pregnancy or childbirth. The majority of these were due to severe bleeding, sepsis or infections, eclampsia, obstructed labor, and consequences from unsafe abortions. Most of these causes are either preventable or have highly effective interventions. An important factor that contributes to the maternal mortality rate is access and opportunity to receive prenatal care. Women who do not receive prenatal care are between three and four times more likely to die from complications resulting from pregnancy or delivery than those who receive prenatal care. Even in high-resource countries, many women do not receive the appropriate preventative or prenatal care. For example, 25% of women in the United States do not receive the recommended number of prenatal visits. This number increases for women among traditionally marginalized populations—32% of African American women and 41% for American Indian and Alaska Native women do not receive the recommended preventative health services prior to delivery.

In 2023, a recent study reported that deaths among  Native American women was three-and-a-half times that of white women. The report attributed the high rate in part to the fact that Native American women are cared for under a poorly funded Federal Health Care System that is so stretched that the average monthly visit lasts only from three to seven minutes. Such a short visit allows neither time for preforming an adequate health assessment nor time for the patient to discuss any problems she may be experiencing.

Medical technologies
The decline in maternal deaths has been due largely to improved aseptic techniques, better fluid management and quicker access to blood transfusions, and better prenatal care.

Technologies have been designed for resource poor settings that have been effective in reducing maternal deaths as well. The non-pneumatic anti-shock garment is a low-technology pressure device that decreases blood loss, restores vital signs and helps buy time in delay of women receiving adequate emergency care during obstetric hemorrhage. It has proven to be a valuable resource. Condoms used as uterine tamponades have also been effective in stopping post-partum hemorrhage.

Medications and surgical management 
Some maternal deaths can be prevented through medication use. Injectable oxytocin can be used to prevent death due to postpartum bleeding. Additionally, postpartum infections can be treated using antibiotics. In fact, the use of broad-spectrum antibiotics both for the prevention and treatment of maternal infection is common in low-income countries. Maternal death due to eclampsia can also be prevented through the use of medications such as magnesium sulfate.

Many complications can be managed with procedures and/or surgery if there is access to a qualified surgeon and appropriate facilities and supplies. For example, the contents of the uterus can be cleaned if there is concern for remaining pregnancy tissue or infection. If there is concern for excess bleeding, special ties, stitches or tools (Bakri Balloon) can be placed if there is concern for excess bleeding.

Public health

A public health approach to addressing maternal mortality includes gathering information on the scope of the problem, identifying key causes, and implementing interventions, both prior to pregnancy and during pregnancy, to combat those causes and prevent maternal mortality.

Public health has a role to play in the analysis of maternal death. One important aspect in the review of maternal death and its causes are Maternal Mortality Review Committees or Boards. The goal of these review committees are to analyze each maternal death and determine its cause. After this analysis, the information can be combined in order to determine specific interventions that could lead to preventing future maternal deaths. These review boards are generally comprehensive in their analysis of maternal deaths, examining details that include mental health factors, public transportation, chronic illnesses, and substance use disorders. All of this information can be combined to give a detailed picture of what is causing maternal mortality and help to determine recommendations to reduce their impact.

Many states within the US are taking Maternal Mortality Review Committees a step further and are collaborating with various professional organizations to improve quality of perinatal care. These teams of organizations form a "perinatal quality collaborative" (PQC) and include state health departments, the state hospital association and clinical professionals such as doctors and nurses. These PQCs can also involve community health organizations, Medicaid representatives, Maternal Mortality Review Committees and patient advocacy groups. By involving all of these major players within maternal health, the goal is to collaborate and determine opportunities to improve quality of care. Through this collaborative effort, PQCs can aim to make impacts on quality both at the direct patient care level and through larger system devices like policy. It is thought that the institution of PQCs in California was the main contributor to the maternal mortality rate decreasing by 50% in the years following. The PQC developed review guides and quality improvement initiatives aimed at the most preventable and prevalent maternal deaths: those due to bleeding and high blood pressure. Success has also been observed with PQCs in Illinois and Florida.

Several interventions prior to pregnancy have been recommended in efforts to reduce maternal mortality. Increasing access to reproductive healthcare services, such as family planning services and safe abortion practices, is recommended in order to prevent unintended pregnancies. Several countries, including India, Brazil, and Mexico, have seen some success in efforts to promote the use of reproductive healthcare services. Other interventions include high quality sex education, which includes pregnancy prevention and sexually transmitted infection (STI) prevention and treatment. By addressing STIs, this not only reduces perinatal infections, but can also help reduce ectopic pregnancy caused by STIs. Adolescent mothers are between two and five times more likely to die than a female twenty years or older. Access to reproductive services and sex education could make a large impact, specifically on adolescents, who are generally uneducated in regards to carrying a healthy pregnancy. Education level is a strong predictor of maternal health as it gives women the knowledge to seek care when it is needed. Public health efforts can also intervene during pregnancy to improve maternal outcomes. Areas for intervention have been identified in access to care, public knowledge, awareness about signs and symptoms of pregnancy complications, and improving relationships between healthcare professionals and expecting mothers.

Access to care during pregnancy is a significant issue in the face of maternal mortality. "Access" encompasses a wide range of potential difficulties including costs, location of healthcare services, availability of appointments, availability of trained health care workers, transportation services, and cultural or language barriers that could inhibit a woman from receiving proper care. For women carrying a pregnancy to term, access to necessary antenatal (prior to delivery) healthcare visits is crucial to ensuring healthy outcomes. These antenatal visits allow for early recognition and treatment of complications, treatment of infections and the opportunity to educate the expecting mother on how to manage her current pregnancy and the health advantages of spacing pregnancies apart.

Access to birth at a facility with a skilled healthcare provider present has been associated with safer deliveries and better outcomes. The two areas bearing the largest burden of maternal mortality, Sub-Saharan Africa and South Asia, also had the lowest percentage of births attended by a skilled provider, at just 45% and 41% respectively. Emergency obstetric care is also crucial in preventing maternal mortality by offering services like emergency cesarean sections, blood transfusions, antibiotics for infections and assisted vaginal delivery with forceps or vacuum. In addition to physical barriers that restrict access to healthcare, financial barriers also exist. Close to one out of seven women of child-bearing age have no health insurance. This lack of insurance impacts access to pregnancy prevention, treatment of complications, as well as perinatal care visits contributing to maternal mortality.

By increasing public knowledge and awareness through health education programs about pregnancy, including signs of complications that need addressed by a healthcare provider, this will increase the likelihood of an expecting mother to seek help when it is necessary. Higher levels of education have been associated with increased use of contraception and family planning services as well as antenatal care. Addressing complications at the earliest sign of a problem can improve outcomes for expecting mothers, which makes it extremely important for a pregnant woman to be knowledgeable enough to seek healthcare for potential complications. Improving the relationships between patients and the healthcare system as a whole will make it easier for a pregnant woman to feel comfortable seeking help. Good communication between patients and providers, as well as cultural competence of the providers, could also assist in increasing compliance with recommended treatments.

Another important preventive measure being implemented is specialized education for mothers. Doctors and medical professionals providing simple information to women, especially women in lower socioeconomic areas will decrease the miscommunication that often occurs between doctors and patients. Training health care professionals will be another important aspect in decreasing the rate of maternal death, "The study found that white medical students and residents often believed incorrect and sometimes 'fantastical' biological fallacies about racial differences in patients. For these assumptions, researchers blamed not individual prejudice but deeply ingrained unconscious stereotypes about people of color, as well as physicians' difficulty in empathizing with patients whose experiences differ from their own."

Policy

The biggest global policy initiative for maternal health came from the United Nations' Millennium Declaration which created the Millennium Development Goals. In 2012, this evolved at the United Nations Conference on Sustainable Development to become the Sustainable Development Goals (SDGs) with a target year of 2030. The SDGs are 17 goals that call for global collaboration to tackle a wide variety of recognized problems. Goal 3 is focused on ensuring health and well-being for women of all ages. A specific target is to achieve a global maternal mortality ratio of less than 70 per 100,000 live births. So far, specific progress has been made in births attended by a skilled provider, now at 80% of births worldwide compared with 62% in 2005.

Countries and local governments have taken political steps in reducing maternal deaths. Researchers at the Overseas Development Institute studied maternal health systems in four apparently similar countries: Rwanda, Malawi, Niger, and Uganda. In comparison to the other three countries, Rwanda has an excellent recent record of improving maternal death rates. Based on their investigation of these varying country case studies, the researchers conclude that improving maternal health depends on three key factors:

 reviewing all maternal health-related policies frequently to ensure that they are internally coherent;
 enforcing standards on providers of maternal health services;
 any local solutions to problems discovered should be promoted, not discouraged.

In terms of aid policy, proportionally, aid given to improve maternal mortality rates has shrunken as other public health issues, such as HIV/AIDS and malaria have become major international concerns. Maternal health aid contributions tend to be lumped together with newborn and child health, so it is difficult to assess how much aid is given directly to maternal health to help lower the rates of maternal mortality. Regardless, there has been progress in reducing maternal mortality rates internationally.

In countries where abortion practices are not considered legal, it is necessary to look at the access that women have to high-quality family planning services, since some of the restrictive policies around abortion could impede access to these services. These policies may also affect the proper collection of information for monitoring maternal health around the world.

Epidemiology

Maternal deaths and disabilities are leading contributors in women's disease burden with an estimated 303,000 women killed each year in childbirth and pregnancy worldwide. The global rate in 2017 is 211 maternal deaths per 100,000 live births and 45% of postpartum deaths occur within 24 hours. Ninety-nine percent of maternal deaths occur in low-resource countries.

At a country level, India (19% or 56,000) and Nigeria (14% or 40,000) accounted for roughly one third of the maternal deaths in 2010. Democratic Republic of the Congo, Pakistan, Sudan, Indonesia, Ethiopia, United Republic of Tanzania, Bangladesh and Afghanistan accounted for between 3 and 5 percent of maternal deaths each. These ten countries combined accounted for 60% of all the maternal deaths in 2010 according to the United Nations Population Fund report. Countries with the lowest maternal deaths were Greece, Iceland, Poland, and Finland.

As of 2017, countries in Southeast Asia and Sub-Saharan Africa account for approximately 86% of all maternal death in the world. Sub-Saharan African countries accounted for about two-thirds of the global maternal deaths and Southeast Asian countries accounted for approximately one-fifth. Since 2000, Southeast Asian countries have seen a significant decrease in maternal mortality with an overall decrease in maternal mortality of almost 60%. Sub-Saharan Africa also saw an almost 40% decrease in maternal mortality between 2000 and 2017. As of 2017, the countries with the highest maternal mortality rates included South Sudan, Somalia, Central African Republic, Yemen, Syria, South Sudan, and the Democratic Republic of the Congo. The numbers for maternal mortality in these countries are likely affect by the political and civil unrest that these countries are facing.

Significant progress has been made since the United Nations made the reduction of maternal mortality part of the Millennium Development Goals (MDGs) in 2000. Bangladesh, for example, cut the number of deaths per live births by almost two-thirds from 1990 to 2015.  A further reduction of maternal mortality is now part of the Agenda 2030 for sustainable development. The United Nations has more recently developed a list of goals termed the Sustainable Development Goals. The target of the third Sustainable Development Goal (SDG) is to reduce the global maternal mortality rate (MMR) to less than 70 per 100,000 live births by 2030. Some of the specific aims of the Sustainable Development Goals are to prevent unintended pregnancies by ensuring more women have access to contraceptives, as well as providing women who become pregnant with a safe environment for delivery with respectful and skilled care. This initiative also included access to emergency services for women who developed complications during delivery.

The WHO has developed a global goal to end preventable death related to maternal mortality. A major goal of this strategy is to identify and address the causes of maternal and reproductive morbidities and mortalities, as well as disabilities related to maternal health outcomes. Their strategy aims to address inequalities in access to reproductive, maternal, and newborn services, as well as the quality of care with universal health coverage. The WHO strategy also aims to ensure quality data collection in order to better respond to the needs of women and girls while improving the equity and quality of care provided to women.

Variation within countries
There are significant maternal mortality intra-country variations, especially in nations with large equality gaps in income and education and high healthcare disparities. Women living in rural areas experience higher maternal mortality than women living in urban and sub-urban centers because those living in wealthier households, having higher education, or living in urban areas, have higher use of healthcare services than their poorer, less-educated, or rural counterparts. There are also racial and ethnic disparities in maternal health outcomes which increases maternal mortality in marginalized groups.

Maternal mortality ratio by country

The maternal mortality ratio (MMR) is the annual number of female deaths per 100,000 live births from any cause related to or aggravated by pregnancy or its management (excluding accidental or incidental causes).

In the year 2017, 810 women died from preventable causes related to pregnancy and birth per day which totaled to approximately 295,000 maternal deaths that year alone. It was also estimated that 94% of maternal deaths occurred in low-resource countries in the same year.

In a retrospective study done across several countries in 2007, the cause of death and causal relationship to the mode of delivery in pregnant women was examined from the years 2000 to 2006. It was discovered that the excess maternal death rate of women who experienced a pulmonary embolism was casually related to undergoing a cesarean delivery. There was also an association found between neuraxial anesthesia, more commonly known as an epidural, and an increased risk for an epidural hematoma. Both of these risks could be reduced by the institution of graduated compression, whether by compression stockings or a compression device. There is also speculation that eliminating the concept of elective cesarean sections in the United States would significantly lower the maternal death rate.

Related terms

Severe maternal morbidity
Severe maternal morbidity (SMM) is an unanticipated acute or chronic health outcome after labor and delivery that detrimentally affects a woman's health. Severe Maternal Morbidity (SMM) includes any unexpected outcomes from labor or delivery that cause both short and long-term consequences to the mother's overall health. There are nineteen total indicators used by the CDC to help identify SMM, with the most prevalent indicator being a blood transfusion. Other indicators include an acute myocardial infarction ("heart attack"), aneurysm, and kidney failure. All of this identification is done by using ICD-10 codes, which are disease identification codes found in hospital discharge data. Using these definitions that rely on these codes should be used with careful consideration since some may miss some cases, have a low predictive value, or may be difficult for different facilities to operationalize. There are certain screening criteria that may be helpful and are recommended through the American College of Obstetricians and Gynecologists as well as the Society for Maternal-Fetal Medicine (SMFM). These screening criteria for SMM are for transfusions of four or more units of blood and admission of a pregnant woman or a postpartum woman to an ICU facility or unit.

The greatest proportion of women with SMM are those who require a blood transfusion during delivery, mostly due to excessive bleeding. Blood transfusions given during delivery due to excessive bleeding has increased the rate of mothers with SMM. The rate of SMM has increased almost 200% between 1993 (49.5 per 100,000 live births) and 2014 (144.0 per 100,000 live births). This can be seen with the increased rate of blood transfusions given during delivery, which increased from 1993 (24.5 per 100,000 live births) to 2014 (122.3 per 100,000 live births).

In the United States, severe maternal morbidity has increased over the last several years, impacting greater than 50,000 women in 2014 alone. There is no conclusive reason for this dramatic increase. It is thought that the overall state of health for pregnant women is impacting these rates. For example, complications can derive from underlying chronic medical conditions like diabetes, obesity, HIV/AIDS, and high blood pressure. These underlying conditions are also thought to lead to increased risk of maternal mortality.

The increased rate for SMM can also be indicative of potentially increased rates for maternal mortality, since without identification and treatment of SMM, these conditions would lead to increased maternal death rates. Therefore, diagnosis of SMM can be considered a "near miss" for maternal mortality. With this consideration, several different expert groups have urged obstetric hospitals to review SMM cases for opportunities that can lead to improved care, which in turn would lead to improvements with maternal health and a decrease in the number of maternal deaths.

See also 

 Child health
 Confidential Enquiry into Maternal Deaths in the UK
 Infant mortality
 List of women who died in childbirth
 Maternal mortality in fiction
 Maternal near miss
 Obstetric transition
 Perinatal mortality
 Black maternal mortality in the United States

References

Bibliography

External links 

 The World Health Report 2005 – Make Every Mother and Child Count

 
Medical aspects of death
Pathology of pregnancy, childbirth and the puerperium
Medical terminology
Demography
Midwifery